The 1972–73 Honduran Liga Nacional season was expected to be the 8th edition of the Honduran Liga Nacional.  However, on 12 August 1972, due to economic problems the tournament was cancelled after nine weeks completed.  It's unclear how Club Deportivo Olimpia and C.D.S. Vida obtained berths to the 1973 CONCACAF Champions' Cup.

1972–73 teams

 Atlético Indio (Tegucigalpa)
 Broncos (Choluteca)
 España (San Pedro Sula)
 Marathón (San Pedro Sula)
 Motagua (Tegucigalpa)
 Olimpia (Tegucigalpa)
 Platense (Puerto Cortés)
 Troya (Tegucigalpa)
 Universidad (Tegucigalpa, promoted)
 Vida (La Ceiba)

 Broncos bought Verdún's franchise

Regular season

Standings

 The tournament was canceled after nine rounds.

Squads

Known results

References

Liga Nacional de Fútbol Profesional de Honduras seasons
1
Honduras
Honduras